Wallidan Football Club is a Gambian professional football club based in Banjul and Bakau. They play in the top division in Gambian football, the GFA League First Division, and are the most decorated team in the country's football history. They play at the Independence Stadium which has a capacity of 40,000.

The club is one of the most successful in the Gambia with 16 championship titles won and 24 FF cup titles won (the most successful in the Gambia), 39 honours in all.

Wallidan has appeared several times in championships and cup matches at the continental level, more than any other Gambian club.  Recently Wallidan has withdrawn from the CAF Champions League and the 2016 CAF Confederation Cup. 2021 FF CUP Winner

History

The club was founded after Gambian independence in 1965.  Not long after, it became a registered club and played in the First Division which was then called the National Division, the only division existing at the time.  In 1970, the club won their first championship, then a second in 1971. Wallidan won two consecutive titles again in 1977 which was their fifth.  More champ titles were won in 1979, 1985, 1988, 1992 and 1995, two times they won two consecutive titles in 2002 and in 2005, their most recent championship title was won in 2008.

Wallidan became the masters of the Gambian Cup since 1974, four consecutive cup titles were won in 1974, three consecutive titles were won in 1978, their eighth title was won in 1981, their ninth in 1984, six consecutive titles cup were won in 1994, in the 1987 edition, Wallidan defeated the Hawks 5–1 in the cup final, the 1989, 1990 and the 1991 editions were cancelled, Wallidan defeated Peak Marwich in 1992 and Real de Banjul 2–1 in 1993.  Two consecutive cup titles were won in 1999, all won in penalty shootouts, both of them 4–3 first in two matches that ended in a goal draw with the Gambia(n) Ports Authority in 1998 and then Mass Sosseh 1–1.  Four consecutive cup titles were won in 2004.  Walidan defeated Blackpool (a club now known as Interior, based in Serrekunda East) 3–0, the last cup final match with Real de Banjul 1–0 in 2002, the last cup final match with the Hawks 1–0 in 2003 where they won their 20th cup title and Armed Forces FC in 2004 as the match ended in a goal draw, it went to another penalty shootout and won 9 to 8.  Wallidan won two more cups, in 2008 where they defeated Samger 4–2 in penalty shootouts as the match finished in a two-goal draw and in 2015 after defeating GAMTEL Banjul 2–0.

At the continentals
Wallidan competed the most at the continentals.  Their first was the 1975 CAF Cup Winner's Cup where they lost to Dakar's ASC Jeanne d'Arc in the Senegambian derby.  They returned in 1977 and lost to Espoirs Nouakchott and again in 1979 but lost 4–5 in the penalty shootouts.  Wallidan's first championship appearance was in 1978 and advanced up to the first round, their greatest, first to Garde Nationale of Mauritania, based in Nouakchott, they defeated that club, then to Cameroon's Canon Yaoundé and lost under the away goals rule.  Their second championship was in 1980 and lost to Upper Volta's (now Burkina Faso) Silures Bobo-Dioulasso (now as FC Bobo-Dioulasso).  Wallidan appeared in the 1982 CAF Cup Winners' Cup and lost to Accra Hearts of Oak and then to Horoya AC in 1985.  Wallidan made their third continental champ appearance and lost to Accra's Hearts of Oak in the 1986 edition, their last under the name African Cup of Champions Clubs. Wallidan made their greatest continental appearance heading to the quarterfinals. They defeated Mauritania's Amical Douane (French for the friendly customs), that club withdrew and the match in Nouakchott was not played, then Marrakech (also as Marrakesh) as they withdrew, the Real Republicans of Freetown and lost to Bizertin from Tunisia.  Wallidan missed the 1992 and the 1994 editions due to financial reasons. Wallidan came to their 7th Winners' Cup appearance in 199, as Marrakech (or Marrakesh) withdrew, they were to face Marsa, Wallidan withdrew.  Wallidan's had their fourth championship appearance and their first as the CAF Champions League in 1998, in the qualifying round, lost to AS Douanes, Wallidan's second Senegambian derby.  Their 8th continental cup appearance was in 2000 and lost to Benin's Mogas 90 FC, their last under the name CAF Cup Winners' Cup.  Wallidan showed up in the 2002 Champions League and defeated Horoya AC, then lost to Raja Casablanca.  A year later, they appeared once more and defeated Dragons FC de l'Ouémé and in the first round lost to USM Alger.  After only winning their cup title in 2003, they appeared in their 9th cup competition and the first as the Confederation Cup in 2004, the club lost to Club Africain of Tunisia under the away goals rule. In their 7th champ appearance in 2005, the club was playing against Ghana's Asante Kotoko, as Wallidan fielded an ineligible player, the GFA disqualified Wallidan from the competition.  The 2005 edition was the last time Wallidan played a match.  Wallidan was to appear in the 2009 Champions League to face Hearts of Oak, due to financial concerns, Wallidan withdrew, it was their recent championship appearance totalling 9.  In 2016, the club was to face MC Oran in the Confederation Cup, Wallidan withdrew.

Stadium
Independence Stadium is a multi-use stadium in Bakau west of the city centre of Banjul. It is currently used mostly for football matches.  The stadium holds 20,000. It is played along with other clubs such as the Hawks plays.

Logo
Its logo has a blue coloured seal with a thick white rim in the outer part and a small one in the middle, inside are two white shrimps guarding the football, on top is the club name and on the bottom is the club's foundation year.

The older logo used up to the 2000s had a white seal with a thick red rim that is lighter on the bottom nearly to purple, along with its thick square inside, inside had a smaller circle with the letter "V" and the club name, first written in the Frenchified form of "Wallidane" and on the bottom "Gambian FC".

Honours
GFA League First Division: 16
 1970, 1971, 1976, 1977, 1979, 1981, 1982, 1985, 1988, 1992, 1995, 2001, 2002, 2004, 2005, 2008

Gambian Cup: 24
 1971, 1972, 1973, 1974, 1976, 1977, 1978, 1981, 1984, 1986, 1987, 1988, 1992, 1993, 1994, 1998, 1999, 2001, 2002, 2003, 2004, 2008, 2015, 2022 

Gambian Super Cup: 4
 1999, 2001, 2002, 2003

League and cup history

Performance in CAF competitions

1 The match in Mauritania was not played as Amical Douane withdrew
2 KAC Marrakech abandoned the tournament
3 Wallidan abandoned the tournament
4 Wallidan was disqualified by the Gambian Football Federation

National level

Statistics
Best position: First Round (continental)
Best position at cup competitions: Quarterfinals (continental)

References

External links
 Official website

 
Football clubs in the Gambia
Banjul
1969 establishments in the Gambia
Association football clubs established in 1969